Florida v. Georgia, 58 U.S. (17 How.) 478 (1854), was a United States Supreme Court case invoking the Court's original jurisdiction to determine boundary disputes between states.  In this case the boundary dispute was between the State of Florida and the State of Georgia.

Background 
Florida claimed that the state line was a straight line (called McNeil's line, for the man who surveyed it for the U.S. government in 1825) from the confluence of Georgia's Chattahoochee and Flint rivers (forming the Apalachicola River, at a point now under Lake Seminole), then very slightly south of due east to the source of the St. Mary's River, which was the point specified in Pinckney's Treaty in 1795. That eastern point of the straight line was near Ellicott mound, which was erected in 1799 at "about 30° 34' N." The McNeil line was looked upon for more than 20 years as the proper location of the boundary. 

Georgia claimed that the headwaters of the St. Mary's River were at the source of the southern branch, some 30 miles or nearly 50 kilometers south, at Lake Spalding or Lake Randolph. If upheld, Georgia would have obtained additional territory estimated at 800 to 2,355 square miles. The position of the U.S. commissioners was that the actual source of the St. Mary's was two miles north of the Ellicott mound.

Other Supreme Court cases involving Georgia boundary disputes include: State of Alabama v. State of Georgia, 64 U.S. 505 (1860), and two Georgia v. South Carolina cases in 1922 and 1990.

Opinion of the Court 

Chief Justice Taney delivered the opinion of the Court, ruling in favor of Florida and setting the state boundary line along "McNeil's line." This outcome was followed in 1859 by the surveying of the Orr and Whitner line. On April 9, 1872, Congress approved the Orr and Whitner Line as part of the border between Georgia and Florida.

Dissent 
Justice Curtis, joined by Justices McLean, Daniel and Campbell, delivered the dissenting opinion, asserting that the United States was effectively made a party through the Attorney General, and such intervention by the United States government was an impermissible intervention in matters of the individual states.

See also 
 New Hampshire v. Maine
 State of New Mexico v. State of Texas

References

External links 
 
 

1854 in United States case law
United States Constitution Article One case law
United States Supreme Court cases
United States Supreme Court original jurisdiction cases
Internal territorial disputes of the United States
Legal history of Florida
Legal history of Georgia (U.S. state)
1854 in Florida
1854 in Georgia (U.S. state)
United States Supreme Court cases of the Taney Court